Mojca Božič (born ) is a Slovenian female volleyball player, playing as a middle blocker. She is part of the Slovenia women's national volleyball team.

She competed at the 2015 Women's European Volleyball Championship. On club level she plays for OK Kamnik.

References

External links
 
 

1992 births
Living people
Slovenian women's volleyball players